Hamburg, New York may refer to the following locations

In Erie County, New York:

Hamburg (town), New York
Hamburg (village), New York (within the Town of Hamburg)

In Greene County, New York
Hamburg (hamlet), New York